Byron Fija (Okinawan: 比嘉 光龍, Fija Bairon;  born 1 September 1969 in Naha) is an Okinawan linguist who practices Okinawan language and activist.

He is a radio and TV personality well known in his homeland Okinawa as a knowledgeable scholar, teacher and skilled practitioner of the endangered Okinawan languages.

Biography 
Fija was born to an Okinawan mother and an American father who was likely a U.S. soldier, but was left with an uncle and aunt soon after birth. He refers to himself as "American-Uchinanchu" (American-Okinawan).

As a child, he was picked on by his classmates who called him "America" because of his appearance. At the age of 22, he went to the United States and found it equally irritating that it was assumed that he could speak English because of his appearance. When he returned to Okinawa at age 24 he encountered the traditional Okinawan folk songs sung in Okinawan language and realized that he identified as Okinawan and wanted to learn the language of the songs.

Practice 
With no classes or institutions teaching the language Fija had to find his own way of learning. He learned by talking to elderly people still able to speak Okinawan. His main teacher was a famous stage actor, Makishi Kochu (1923–2011), whom he visited every week to learn. After mastering the language Fija started to teach. For years, he has had a radio show which he conducts entirely in local language. Residents – almost all elderly – call in to request songs and to chat. He appears on TV shows and is also being paid by the Naha city government to teach local residents.

In popular culture 
Fija is an outspoken advocate for more native language practice in daily life and encourages people in Okinawa to learn the language. As one of the few fluent speakers of the language he is the go-to-person for domestic and international media and regularly attends national and international events on the matter of endangered languages or Okinawan languages.

A video featuring Fija singing traditional Okinawan folk songs in Okinawan language is included in a collection at the Ethnological Museum Berlin compiled by the Okinawan artist Yuken Teruya as part of a new collection telling Okinawan history until today.

See also 

 Article at Japantimes 
 Article at BBC 
 Article at Washington Post 
 Fija's homepage

References 

People from Okinawa Prefecture
Living people
1969 births
Japanese people of American descent
20th-century Japanese male singers
20th-century Japanese singers
Language activists
People from Naha